Ibrahim Cissé may refer to:
Ibrahim Cissé (academic) (born 1983), Nigerien biophysicist and professor
Ibrahim Cissé (footballer, born 1996), French footballer
Ibrahim Cissé (footballer, born 1999), Ivorian footballer

See also
Ibrahima Cissé (born 1994), Guinean footballer